Sá da Bandeira may refer to:
Lubango, Angola, old name Sá da Bandeira until 1975
Rua de Sá da Bandeira, a place in Santo Ildefonso, Porto, Portugal
Bernardo de Sá Nogueira de Figueiredo, 1st Marquess of Sá da Bandeira, five times Prime Minister of Portugal

See also
Bandeira (disambiguation)
Sá (disambiguation)